Nizhnesorokino is a rural locality (a village) in Irsayevsky Selsoviet, Mishkinsky District, Bashkortostan, Russia. The population was 197 as of 2010. There are 4 streets.

Geography 
Nizhnesorokino is located 11 km north of Mishkino (the district's administrative centre) by road. Verkhnesorokino is the nearest rural locality.

References 

Rural localities in Mishkinsky District